Crocidophora cuprotinctalis is a moth in the family Crambidae. It was described by Aristide Caradja in 1932. It is found in Zhejiang, China.

References

Moths described in 1932
Pyraustinae